The 131st season of the Victorian Football League/Victorian Football Association was held in 2012. Geelong won the 2012 VFL Premiership, defeating Port Melbourne in the Grand Final.

Season summary
For the 2012 VFL season, the Bendigo Football Club changed its name to the Bendigo Gold. The change came after it was announced that 2012 would be the final season Bendigo would be aligned with the Essendon Football Club, with the latter to be fielding its own reserves team in the VFL from the 2013 season.

The Northern Bullants also changed their nickname, becoming the Northern Blues and adopting navy blue and white colours in the tenth year of its affiliation with the Carlton Football Club.

The top three teams from the 2011 VFL season – Port Melbourne, Werribee and Williamstown – competed in the 2012 Foxtel Cup, with Werribee losing in the Grand Final to WAFL team Claremont.

Casey Scorpions finished on top of the ladder with fourteen wins, however lost both its finals matches to be knocked out of the finals series. Port Melbourne and Geelong progressed to the Grand Final at Etihad Stadium. Geelong won its third premiership as a stand-alone VFL team, with previous victories in 2002 and 2007.

Ladder

Finals

Qualifying and Elimination Finals

Semi-finals

Preliminary Finals

Grand Final

Awards
The J. J. Liston Trophy was won by Ben Ross (Werribee), who polled 20 votes. Ross finished ahead of Tom Couch (Casey Scorpions), who was second with 19 votes, and John Baird (Port Melbourne), who was third with 18 votes.
The Frosty Miller Medal was won by Dean Galea (Port Melbourne), who kicked 76 goals for the season.
The Fothergill-Round Medal was won by Dean Towers (North Ballarat)
The top two non-AFL clubs – Port Melbourne and Werribee – qualified for the 2013 Foxtel Cup tournament.
The premiership in the reserves, which was renamed the Development League from 2012, was won by Coburg. Coburg 16.12 (108) defeated Box Hill 15.11 (101) in the Grand Final, played as a curtain-raiser to the seniors first preliminary final on 15 September at North Port Oval.

See also 
 List of VFA/VFL premiers
 Australian Rules Football
 Victorian Football League
 Australian Football League
 2012 AFL season

References

External links
AFL Victoria website
Official VFL website

Victorian Football League seasons
VFL